The Rolls-Royce RR500 is a family of small gas turbine engines developed by Rolls-Royce Corporation. The RR500TP turboprop variant was intended for use in small aircraft. The RR500TS was the turboshaft variant designed for light helicopters. Development of the RR500 was abandoned in 2012.

Design and development

The RR500 is a larger derivative of the Rolls-Royce RR300 turboshaft, with the engine core scaled-up for increased power.

The basic weight of the engine with accessories is 250 lb (113 kg).  The model produces around 500 shp (373 kW) for takeoff and can produce  in continuous use.  Like its predecessor the Rolls-Royce Model 250 and all turbine engines (including the competing Pratt & Whitney Canada PT6), it is claimed to require less frequent maintenance than piston engines of similar power, albeit with the higher maintenance costs associated with turbine engines. A RR500TS turboshaft variant was also under development.

Development of the RR500 series ended in 2012.

Variants
RR500TP  
RR500TS

Specifications (RR500 proposed)

See also
 Rolls-Royce Model 250
 Rolls-Royce RR300

References

 Flying (magazine), Vol. 135 Issue 11, Nov. 2008, p. 32, "Rolls-Royce Launches Turboprop for Small Airplanes"

External links
 Rolls-Royce RR500 Official page

Rolls-Royce aircraft gas turbine engines
2000s turboshaft engines
2000s turboprop engines